Sanctuaries are a class of protected areas in Sri Lanka and are administered by the Department of Wildlife Conservation. Sanctuaries are governed by the Fauna and Flora Protection Ordinance (No. 2) of 1937 and may be created, amended or abolished by ministerial order. All wildlife in sanctuaries are protected but the habitat is only protected in state-owned land, allowing human activities to continue on privately owned land. Activities prohibited in sanctuaries include hunting, killing or removing any wild animal; destroying eggs/nests of birds and reptiles; disturbing of wild animals; and interfering in the breeding of any animal. Permission is not required to enter sanctuaries.

Sanctuaries

References

External links
 Department of Wildlife Conservation, Sri Lanka

Wildlife sanctuaries
 
Wildlife sanctuaries